Tervela Inc. is a privately held technology company based in Boston, Massachusetts, and New York, New York. The company is backed by Goldman Sachs, Sigma Partners, Acartha Technology Group, and North Hill Ventures. Tervela was founded in 2004 by Barry Thompson and Kul Singh.

History 

Tervela's Data Fabric consists of both hardware appliances and software (virtual) appliances that overlay on top of existing data center infrastructure and cloud services.  The company introduced the first hardware-accelerated messaging switch in 2007 prior to this hardware accelerated message switching was done primarily on XML data. In 2009 the company introduced several products that allowed scalable middleware to deliver messages incrementally scalable well into the millions of messages per second. In 2011 Tervela introduced a set of virtual appliances compatible with hardware-accelerated appliances.

As the growth of cloud services and content collaboration platforms began to accelerate, in 2015 Tervela launched Cloud FastPath, a SaaS for migrating organizations user data into content collaboration platforms from on-premises file servers, SharePoint, ECM systems, as well as between content collaboration systems. Between 2015 and 2017, Tervela announced partnerships with Box, Dropbox, Google, Microsoft, Egnyte, and other platform providers.

Tervela was acquired by Box in 2017.

Notes

Defunct technology companies of the United States